The 2001 NCAA Division I Women's Golf Championships were contested at the 20th annual NCAA-sanctioned golf tournament to determine the individual and team national champions of women's Division I collegiate golf in the United States.

The tournament was held at LPGA International in Daytona Beach, Florida.

Georgia won the team championship, the Bulldogs' first.

Candy Hannemann, from Duke, won the individual title.

Individual results

Individual champion
 Candy Hannemann, Duke (285, +1)

Team leaderboard

 DC = Defending champion
 Debut appearance

References

NCAA Women's Golf Championship
Golf in Florida
NCAA Women's Golf Championship
NCAA Women's Golf Championship
NCAA Women's Golf Championship